Acacia grandifolia is a tree belonging to the genus Acacia and the subgenus Juliflorae that is native to north eastern Australia. It is list as vulnerable according to the Environment Protection and Biodiversity Conservation Act 1999.

Description
It has dark brown coloured bark that is deeply furrowed. The acutely angular and stout branchlets are densely covered in soft velvety grey hairs. Like most species of Acacia it has phyllodes rather than true leaves. The phyllodes are stiff and coriaceous and have three to four yellowish and prominent main nerves running together near the base. It blooms between July and October producing golden flowers.

Distribution
It is endemic to two small areas in the Burnett District of south east Queensland where it is often situated amongst outcrops of sandstone growing in sandy or in shallow, stony soils that have originated from basalt. It is found in hilly terrain of differing slopes and aspects, in gullies, on plains and on hill crests. and grows well in disturbed ground and along roadsides. It occurs in dense stands or as part of gun-tree woodland communities along with Eucalyptus crebra, Corymbia citriodora, Corymbia trachyphloia and Eucalyptus exserta.

See also
List of Acacia species

References

grandifolia
Flora of Queensland
Taxa named by Leslie Pedley
Plants described in 1978